The Indonesian Fascist Party (or ) was a short-lived Fascist political party founded in Bandung, Dutch East Indies in the summer of 1933 by a Javanese economist and politician named Notonindito. Although it did not last long and is poorly documented, it is often cited as an example of how European Fascist ideas could manifest themselves in an Asian context, as well as appearing in conspiracy literature exaggerating its importance.

History
Notonindito, the party's founder, was already well acquainted with Europeans and European society in the Indies in his youth through his membership in the Theosophical Society. In the early 1920s he had traveled to Europe to complete his education, first in The Hague and then in Berlin, where he finished a doctorate in Economics and Commerce. After his return to the Indies, he became involved in the Indonesian nationalist movement, at first in the Sarekat Islam Party in 1927 and then Sukarno's Indonesian National Party in 1929, eventually becoming its chairman in Pekalongan.

These organizations appealed to expatriate Germans living in the Indies, as well as some Dutch and Indo (mixed race) people.

The party was said to have as its goal an independent Java with a descendant of Sutawijaya (founder of the Mataram Sultanate) as its constitutional monarch. The party also wished the Indies to become a federation of such independent kingdoms with a non-aggression pact with the Netherlands. Reaction to the new party was generally quite negative in the Indies press. For example, a newspaper associated with the Indonesian National Party, stated that solutions to the Indies' problems should be found in the present, not in the Feudal past. , likewise, thought that such a project was against the interests of the common Indonesian and that a twisting of Javanese historical figures into Fascist mythology was poorly considered, whereas the editors of  thought the party was counterproductive and harmful. Notonindito quickly denied to newspapers that he had "accepted the offer" of this party to become its leader. Nonetheless, investigation by De Locomotief seemed to indicate that the party did indeed existed and that it had a few dozen members at that time. It is unclear what happened to the party soon after.

References

Political parties established in 1933
1933 establishments in the Dutch East Indies
Defunct political parties in the Netherlands
Defunct political parties in Indonesia
Fascist parties in the Netherlands
1933 disestablishments in the Dutch East Indies